The Pohang Steel Yard is a football stadium in Pohang, South Korea. It is the home stadium of Pohang Steelers. The stadium holds 17,443 spectators and was built in 1990 as the first football-specific stadium in South Korea.

Its balcony typed structure presents a full view at any place to the spectators for a clear view. The stadium has a seating capacity for 15,521 spectators.

In 2003, the stadium was upgraded with full repair works such as all-season lawn, up-to-date sound facilities and new lockers for players. The electric scoreboard and lightings, sound facilities and convenient facilities are rated as good as those of the stadiums built to host the 2002 FIFA World Cup.

References

External links
 Pohang Steel Yard at World Stadiums

Football venues in South Korea
Sports venues in North Gyeongsang Province
Pohang Steelers
Sports venues completed in 1990
K League 1 stadiums